Ken Fisher may refer to:

 Kenneth Fisher (born 1950), financial manager & journalist
 Kenneth Fisher (headmaster) (1882–1945), headmaster of Oundle School
 Ken Fisher, American cartoonist, a.k.a. Ruben Bolling
 Ken Fisher, founder of website Ars Technica
 Ken Fisher (born 1936), Canadian game creator Wizard card game and Superquiz

See also
Ken Fischer (1945–2006), founder of Trainwreck Circuits